Goran Granić (born 9 July 1975) is a Bosnian and Croatian professional football manager and former player who is the manager of Bosnian Premier League club Posušje.

Managerial statistics

References

External links

1975 births
Living people
Sportspeople from Livno
Croats of Bosnia and Herzegovina
Association football defenders
Bosnia and Herzegovina footballers
Croatian footballers
NK Neretva players
NK Zagreb players
NK Troglav 1918 Livno players
NK Rudar Velenje players
NK Olimpija Ljubljana (1945–2005) players
NK Varaždin players
HNK Hajduk Split players
NK Pomorac 1921 players
FK Dinamo Tirana players
NK Dugopolje players
Croatian Football League players
Slovenian PrvaLiga players
First Football League (Croatia) players
Kategoria Superiore players
Croatian expatriate footballers
Expatriate footballers in Slovenia
Croatian expatriate sportspeople in Slovenia
Expatriate footballers in Albania
Croatian expatriate sportspeople in Albania
Bosnia and Herzegovina football managers
Croatian football managers
Premier League of Bosnia and Herzegovina managers
HŠK Posušje managers